The list of ship launches in 1745 includes a chronological list of some ships launched in 1745.


References

1745
Ship launches